Roger Davidson (born 27 October 1948) is an English former professional footballer who played as a midfielder.

Career
Born in Islington, Davidson joined Arsenal in 1964, turned professional in October 1965, and made his senior debut in March 1968. That remained Davidson's sole Arsenal appearance in the Football League, and he later played for Portsmouth, Fulham, and Lincoln City, before ending his career with Aldershot. After his football career, he worked as a black cab driver.

References

1948 births
Living people
English footballers
Arsenal F.C. players
Portsmouth F.C. players
Fulham F.C. players
Lincoln City F.C. players
Aldershot F.C. players
English Football League players
Association football midfielders